Karma is a Palestinian village located nineteen kilometers south-west of Hebron. The village is in the Hebron Governorate Southern West Bank.

History
In 1883  the PEF's Survey of Western Palestine (SWP) found here "traces of ruins".

According to the Palestinian Central Bureau of Statistics, the village had a population of 1,386 in 2007. The primary health care facilities for the village are at Qila designated by the Ministry of Health as level 1.

Footnotes

Bibliography

External links
Survey of Western Palestine, Map 21:    IAA, Wikimedia commons
Karma Village (Fact Sheet), Applied Research Institute–Jerusalem, (ARIJ)
Karma Village profile, ARIJ
 Karma Village aerial photo, ARIJ
The priorities and needs for development in Karma village based on the community and local authorities' assessment, ARIJ

Villages in the West Bank
Hebron Governorate
Municipalities of the State of Palestine